Sanna is a hamlet at the far western tip of the Scottish peninsula of Ardnamurchan, in Lochaber, Highland. It is one of the most westerly settlements on the mainland of Great Britain, and consists of a small collection of crofts and houses around a series of unspoilt sandy beaches.  It is the setting for most of Alasdair Maclean's autobiographical book Night Falls on Ardnamurchan.

References

External links

Populated places in Lochaber
Ardnamurchan